The Tut is a river of Mizoram, northeastern India. It is a tributary of the Tlawng River.

References

Rivers of Mizoram
Rivers of India